David R. Hanson is a software engineer who worked at Google until he retired in January 2012, working in programming languages, compilers, software tools, and programming environments. Before joining Google, he was with Microsoft Research, Princeton, University of Arizona, and Yale. He has written many journal and conference papers and two books: A Retargetable C Compiler: Design and Implementation with Christopher Fraser, which describes lcc, a widely used compiler for Standard C, and C Interfaces and Implementations: Techniques for Creating Reusable Software.

Hanson is largely responsible for designing and implementing the "View as Slideshow" feature for PowerPoint and attachments in Google's Gmail system.

Hanson enjoys skiing and cycling. He also builds furniture.

References

External links
 Home page for David R. Hanson
 List of publications from the DBLP Bibliography Server
 lcc web site
 C Interfaces and Implementations web site

Hanson, David R.
Princeton University faculty
University of Arizona faculty
Yale University faculty
Living people
Year of birth missing (living people)